These are lists of the insurance companies in the world, as measured by total non-banking assets and by net premiums written.By non-banking assets

By assets 
The list is based on the 2022 report of the 25 largest insurance companies in the world by 2020 assets from AM Best.

By net premiums written 
The list is based on the 2022 report of the 25 largest insurance companies in the world by 2020 net premiums written from AM Best.

References 

Insurance companies
insurance companies